This is a list of adrenergic drugs. These are pharmaceutical drugs, naturally occurring compounds and other chemicals that influence the function of the neurotransmitter epinephrine (adrenaline).

Receptor ligands

α1-adrenergic receptor ligands

Agonists

Antagonists 

Many tricyclic antidepressants, tetracyclic antidepressants, antipsychotics, ergolines, and some piperazines like buspirone, trazodone, nefazodone, etoperidone, and mepiprazole antagonize α1-adrenergic receptors as well, which contributes to their side effects such as orthostatic hypotension.

α2-adrenergic receptor ligands

Agonists

Antagonists 

Many atypical antipsychotics and azapirones like buspirone and gepirone (via metabolite pyrimidinylpiperazine) antagonize α2-adrenergic receptors as well.

β-adrenergic receptor ligands

Agonists

Antagonists

Reuptake inhibitors

Norepinephrine transporter (NET) inhibitors

Vesicular monoamine transporter (VMAT) inhibitors

Releasing agents

Enzyme inhibitors

Anabolism

Phenylalanine hydroxylase (PAH) inhibitors

Tyrosine hydroxylase inhibitors

Aromatic L-amino acid decarboxylase (AAAD) inhibitors

Dopamine-beta-hydroxylase (DBH) inhibitors

Phenylethanolamine N-methyltransferase (PNMT) inhibitors

Catabolism

Monoamine oxidase (MAO) inhibitors 

MAO-B inhibitors also influence norepinephrine/epinephrine levels since they inhibit the breakdown of their precursor dopamine.

Catechol-O-methyl transferase (COMT) inhibitors

Others

Precursors

Cofactors

Activity enhancers

Release blockers

Toxins

References

Adrenergic receptor modulators